Joseph Claude Shell, Sr. (September 7, 1918 – April 7, 2008) was a Republican politician from California who served in the California State Assembly from 1953 to 1963 from the 58th district. He later served on the California Agricultural Labor Relations Board. In 1962 he was a failed primary candidate for Governor of California.

Shell attended the University of Southern California, where he obtained a Bachelor of Science in Business Administration and was captain of the 1939 USC football team which won the Rose Bowl that year. He then served in the U.S. Navy during World War II.

His second wife was Mary Kay Shell, a former member of the Kern County Board of Supervisors and the first female Mayor of Bakersfield.

References 

Members of the California State Legislature
United States Navy personnel of World War II
1918 births
2008 deaths
20th-century American politicians